Darren Mann (born 1989) is a Canadian actor. He portrayed Ballas Kohl in the 2018 film Giant Little Ones.  He also portrayed Jett in the 2020 film Embattled.  His performance in the former film won him a Leo Award.  On television, he portrayed Luke Chalfant in Chilling Adventures of Sabrina.

He appeared opposite Morgan Freeman in the 2022 film The Minute You Wake Up Dead.

Personal life
Mann is from East Vancouver.  He was born to mother Lenore Mann and has a brother, Tyler.

Inspired by his actress/director mother, Mann started acting in Vancouver at the age of 8. He quickly landed roles on stage and in film. However, it was his passion for hockey that made Mann take a break from acting. Mann quickly climbed the ranks becoming a junior-level star, before turning professional. Eventually injuries would force him to retire which would lead him to return to acting.

Select filmography

Film

Television

References

External links
 
 

Living people
21st-century Canadian male actors
Canadian male film actors
Canadian male television actors
1980s births